Poland Township may refer to the following townships in the United States:

 Poland Township, Buena Vista County, Iowa
 Poland Township, Mahoning County, Ohio